Miloš Bubela (born 25 August 1992) is a Slovak ice hockey player who currently plays for HK Poprad of the Slovak Extraliga.

Career
Bubela competed in the 2018 Winter Olympics for the Slovakia men's national ice hockey team in Pyeongchang, South Korea.

Career statistics

Regular season and playoffs

International

References

External links

1992 births
Living people
HK 95 Panthers Považská Bystrica players
HC '05 Banská Bystrica players
HC Dynamo Pardubice players
Ice hockey players at the 2018 Winter Olympics
Slovak ice hockey forwards
Olympic ice hockey players of Slovakia
Dubuque Fighting Saints players
RPI Engineers men's ice hockey players
Utica Comets players
Wheeling Nailers players
Orlando Solar Bears (ECHL) players
Bratislava Capitals players
Sportspeople from Banská Bystrica
HK Poprad players
Slovak expatriate ice hockey players in the Czech Republic
Slovak expatriate ice hockey players in the United States